Joseph Franque, also known as Joseph-Boniface Franque, the twin brother of Jean-Pierre Franque, was born at  Le Buis, France, in 1774, and died in 1833. He also was a painter, and there is by him at Versailles a picture of the Empress Maria Louisa and the King of Rome.

References

 

1774 births
1833 deaths
18th-century French painters
French male painters
19th-century French painters
People from Drôme
Pupils of Jacques-Louis David
18th-century French male artists